Syd Barrett (1946–2006) was an English musician who recorded 37 songs during his short two-year solo career. One of the founding members of English rock band Pink Floyd, he was the dominant force in their early years, writing the majority of the material on their debut album, The Piper at the Gates of Dawn, contributing to their second, A Saucerful of Secrets, and recording several unreleased songs with them. As a result of Barrett's increasing mental illness, guitarist David Gilmour was hired as his possible replacement. When his condition worsened, he was officially excluded from Pink Floyd in April 1968. After his departure, Barrett recorded two solo albums, both released in 1970, until he left the music business in 1972.

Barrett returned to the studio in 1969 to begin work on his first solo album, The Madcap Laughs. His only single, "Octopus", was released in November 1969. Work on The Madcap Laughs proved difficult, going through five different producers, including former Pink Floyd bandmates David Gilmour and Roger Waters, and Barrett himself. Released in January 1970, the album received positive reviews from critics and enjoyed moderate commercial success, reaching number 40 in the UK charts. Two months later, Barrett began recording his second and final solo album, Barrett. Produced by Pink Floyd members David Gilmour and Richard Wright, the sessions were recorded more sporadically than The Madcap Laughs. Barrett was released in November 1970, but failed to chart; no singles were issued from the album. Two years later, Barrett signed a document ending his association with Pink Floyd and any financial interest in future recordings and left the music business. The Madcap Laughs and Barrett were paired and released as Syd Barrett in 1974. Barrett made almost no public appearances for the remainder of his life, and after suffering from Type 2 diabetes for several years, died at his home in Cambridge, England, in 2006 at age 60.

Several compilation albums of Barrett's songs were released before and after his death. The first of these, The Peel Session, an EP containing recordings Barrett performed for the John Peel Top Gear show on 24 February 1970, contains the unreleased song "Two of a Kind". In 1988, Barrett approved the release of Opel, a compilation that contained several unreleased songs and alternate takes of recordings from sessions for his two solo albums. The 1993 box set Crazy Diamond included his solo albums, Opel, and more alternate takes. The compilation album Wouldn't You Miss Me? followed suit, and contained Barrett's highly sought-after "Bob Dylan Blues". The song, along with "Terrapin" from The Madcap Laughs and "Maisie" from Barrett, reflect Barrett's early interest in the blues. The next greatest hits album, An Introduction to Syd Barrett, contained the previously unreleased twenty minute instrumental "Rhamadan" as a CD bonus track. In 2016, Barrett's Pink Floyd-era songs "In the Beechwoods", "Vegetable Man", and "Scream Thy Last Scream" were officially released on the Pink Floyd compilation box set The Early Years 1965–1972; they were meant to be released earlier but were blocked by Pink Floyd.

List

All songs written by Syd Barrett, except where noted.

Notes

References

Bibliography

See also
Syd Barrett discography
List of songs recorded by Pink Floyd
List of unreleased songs recorded by Pink Floyd

 
Barrett, Syd